This is a list of Soviet European Film Award winners and nominees. This list details the performances of Bosnian actors, actresses, and films that have either been submitted or nominated for, or have won, a European Film Award.

Main categories

External links
 Nominees and winners at the European Film Academy website

See also
 List of Soviet submissions for the Academy Award for Best Foreign Language Film

Cinema of the Soviet Union
Soviet Winners
Lists of Soviet films
Lists of mass media in the Soviet Union